Backtrack may refer to:

Arts, entertainment, and media

Films
 Backtrack!, a 1969 Western film starring Doug McClure
 Backtrack, alternate title for Catchfire, a 1990 drama film starring Jodie Foster
 Backtrack (film), a 2015 film

Music
 Backtrack (band), an American hardcore band
 Backtracks (AC/DC album), an album by AC/DC
 Backtracks (Poco album), an album by Poco
 "Backtrack" (song), the fourth single from singer Rebecca Ferguson's debut album, Heaven

Other uses in arts, entertainment, and media
 Back Track, a 1998 first-person shooter for the Game Boy Advance
 BackTrack (magazine), a British railway history monthly magazine
 Backtrack (novel), a 1965 western novel written by Milton Lott
 "Backtrack" (The Professionals), a 1979 episode of the television series

Computing and technology
 BackTrack, a Linux distribution
 Backtracking, a search algorithm in computing
 Backtaxi, an aircraft procedure